"Une femme en prison" is a song by French rapper Stomy Bugsy, featuring American singer Kelly Rowland. It was written by Bugsy along with Djamel "Djam L" Boukhit and Dimitri "Maleko" Jamois for his 2003 studio album 4ème Round, while production was helmed by Boukhit and Jamois. Released as a single in June 2003, it was entered the French Singles Chart, peaking at number 62. The song was also included on the French edition of Rowland's debut album Simply Deep (2002).

Formats and track listings

Credits and personnel
Credits adapted from the liner notes of Simply Deep.

 Cyril Ballouard – guitar
 Jean-Christophe Beaudon – mastering
 Nadia Boukhit – choir
 Thierry Chassang – recording
 Nicolas Duport – mixing, recording
 Djam L – production, writing
 Maleko – production, writing
 Mohamed "Momo" Hasfi – bass
 Isabelle Nesmon – adaptation
 Kelly Rowland – vocals

Charts

References

2003 singles
Kelly Rowland songs
2002 songs